Bruno Müller (11 October 1902 – 8 June 1975) was a German rower who won a gold medal in the coxless pairs at the 1928 Summer Olympics, together with Kurt Moeschter.

References

External links
 

1902 births
1975 deaths
German male rowers
Olympic rowers of Germany
Rowers at the 1928 Summer Olympics
Olympic gold medalists for Germany
Olympic medalists in rowing
Medalists at the 1928 Summer Olympics